Mount Dixon is a snow-covered stratovolcano,  high, standing  west of Anzac Peak on the Laurens Peninsula, Heard Island. The feature appears to have been roughly charted on an 1860 sketch map by Captain H.C. Chester, an American sealer operating in the area during this period. It was surveyed in 1948 by the Australian National Antarctic Research Expeditions (ANARE), and named by them for Lieutenant Commander George M. Dixon, RANVR, commanding officer of HMAS Labuan which landed and relieved the 1948 and 1949 ANARE parties.

No activity has been observed on Mount Dixon, however some lava flows that are vegetation-free suggest an eruption within the last few hundred years.

References 

Volcanoes of Heard Island and McDonald Islands
Quaternary stratovolcanoes